Michael Ralph Schooler (born August 10, 1962) is an American former professional baseball player. Schooler pitched in Major League Baseball (MLB) from - for the Seattle Mariners and the Texas Rangers. He attended Garden Grove High School in Garden Grove, California, Cal State Fullerton and Golden West College.

Professional career

Seattle Mariners
Schooler was selected by the Seattle Mariners in the second round, 35th overall, in the 1985 MLB draft.

He made his MLB debut on June 10, against the Minnesota Twins pitching one scoreless inning.

He ended up posting thirty saves in 1990, good for eighth in the league, but the shoulder injury lingered, and forced him to miss the first half of the  season. He returned July 12 and recorded seven saves, but his arm was still showing the effects of the injury. In , he allowed seven home runs, all of which tied the game or put the opposition in the lead. This resulted in a 4.70 ERA, by far the highest of his career. The Mariners released Schooler following the 1992 season. This paved the way for Norm Charlton to become the Mariners' new closer.

Texas Rangers
On March 22, he was signed as a free agent by the Texas Rangers but was released on September 11 after going 3-0 with a 5.55 ERA in 17 games.

Post career
Schooler has been a gym teacher at Richardson Middle School, and Calle Mayor Middle School in Torrance, California. He is now a gym teacher at Ladera Ranch Middle School in Ladera Ranch, California.

Beginning in 2009, Schooler was the pitching coach for the San Clemente High School baseball team, in San Clemente, California. He coached high school baseball at San Juan Hills High School in San Juan Capistrano, California, from 2014 to 2016.

See also

References

External links

Retrosheet
The Baseball Gauge
Venezuela Winter League

1962 births
Living people
American expatriate baseball players in Canada
Baseball coaches from California
Baseball players from Anaheim, California
Bellingham Mariners players
Cal State Fullerton Titans baseball players
Calgary Cannons players
Chattanooga Lookouts players
High school baseball coaches in the United States
Jacksonville Suns players
Leones del Caracas players
American expatriate baseball players in Venezuela
Major League Baseball pitchers
Midland Angels players
Oklahoma City 89ers players
Seattle Mariners players
Texas Rangers players
Wausau Timbers players
Wichita Wranglers players